The 2006 NBA Finals was the championship series of the 2005–06 NBA season and the conclusion of the season's playoffs. The Dallas Mavericks were favored to win the championship over the Miami Heat. Despite these odds, the Heat won the title in six games over the Mavericks, becoming the third team—after the 1969 Celtics, the 1977 Trail Blazers and later the 2016 Cleveland Cavaliers and 2021 Milwaukee Bucks—to win a championship after trailing 0–2 in the series. Dwyane Wade of the Heat was named Most Valuable Player of the series.

This series marked the first time since 1971 that the Finals featured two teams playing in their first NBA Finals series. It was the first occasion since 1978 that two teams who had never won an NBA Championship contested the NBA Finals. The two teams met again five years later in 2011, the second Finals appearance for both franchises, with the Mavericks winning the rematch over the Heat.

This was the second NBA Finals matchup of teams from Florida and Texas, after the Houston Rockets and Orlando Magic contested the 1995 NBA Finals. Until the Miami Heat defeated the San Antonio Spurs in the 2013 NBA Finals, it was the last Finals loss by a team from Texas (the Rockets lost in 1981 and 1986) against eight championships (five by the Spurs, two by the Rockets, and one by the Mavericks, who won a rematch of this Finals in ). This was the only NBA Finals of the 2000s not to involve the Los Angeles Lakers or the San Antonio Spurs and also the first NBA Finals since 1995 neither Phil Jackson (Bulls and Lakers) or Gregg Popovich included as a coach. It was also the first NBA Finals where both teams' home arenas had naming rights owned by the same company. That company was American Airlines.

Background

The Miami Heat joined the league in the 1988–89 season, but they did not rise to prominence until they hired Pat Riley to be their head coach and president before the 1995–96 season. In Riley's first stint, the Heat were playoff regulars between 1996 and 2001, however, the Chicago Bulls and New York Knicks always thwarted Miami's dreams of a championship or even a Finals berth. However, when the team drafted Dwyane Wade fifth overall in 2003, things started to look up for the Heat. They went 42-40 under interim coach Stan Van Gundy, making the playoffs after a 2-year hiatus. They defeated the New Orleans Hornets in the first round, but they ultimately fell to the Pacers in 6 games. The 2004 offseason saw the addition of Shaquille O'Neal, and with Wade and O'Neal performing well, the Heat won 59 games in the 2004–05 season, as they took the defending champions Detroit Pistons to seven games in the conference finals. The following season, after an early 11–10 start, Van Gundy resigned and Riley returned to coaching. Though injuries and lack of chemistry hobbled the Heat initially, they still managed to win 52 games that season. After a culmination of harmony and momentum came together just before the playoffs, they started their postseason run by defeating the Bulls in six games, then eliminated the New Jersey Nets in five games, and then ousted the 64-win 4 all-star Pistons in six games to reach the NBA Finals for the first time in franchise history.

Path to the Finals

Regular-season series
The Dallas Mavericks won both games in the regular season series:

Broadcasting

ABC had exclusive rights to televise the NBA Finals in the United States. Play-by-play announcer Mike Breen and color commentator Hubie Brown called the action, with courtside reporting by Lisa Salters and Stuart Scott. Radio counterpart ESPN Radio broadcast the Finals, with Jim Durham and Dr. Jack Ramsay calling the action. The featured song, aired throughout the playoffs, was Tom Petty and the Heartbreakers' "Runnin' Down a Dream."

This marked the first of 16 consecutive NBA Finals called by Breen, currently the most among NBA play-by-play voices. However, it was the only NBA Finals to feature Breen with Hubie Brown. The following season, Brown slid down to ESPN's secondary team with Mike Tirico (the pair would also call ESPN Radio's NBA Finals broadcasts that season), while Mark Jackson and Jeff Van Gundy (the latter after his dismissal as Houston Rockets head coach) joined Breen on the lead team.

Game 2 of the Finals, which took place the same evening as the 60th Tony Awards, was the most-watched program of June 11, 2006. ABC won the night with 3.5 rating and 10 share, CBS came in fourth with a 1.5/4 for the Tonys. On June 20, Game 6 had a 4.4/13 among viewers aged 18–49.

The finals were shown on Sky Sports in the UK and Ireland.

Rosters

Miami Heat

Dallas Mavericks

Shaquille O'Neal and Gary Payton became the 6th and 7th players to play in the NBA Finals for three different teams. O'Neal played in the 1995 NBA Finals with the Orlando Magic and four times with the Los Angeles Lakers, while Payton played in the 1996 NBA Finals with the Seattle SuperSonics and with O'Neal on the 2004 Lakers team that lost to the Pistons. The other five players to play in the Finals for three teams are: Danny Ainge, Sam Perkins, John Salley, Horace Grant and Robert Horry.
Also, O'Neal and Alonzo Mourning achieved the rare feat of being the former first-round picks from the same year (1992) to win a championship with the same team. O'Neal was the first overall draft pick of the Orlando Magic, while Mourning went second to the Charlotte Hornets. Ironically, the third pick in that draft, Christian Laettner, was a member of the previous year's team, his final season before retiring.

Series summary

The Heat became the second team since 1985 to sweep the middle three games at home, the 2004 Detroit Pistons being the first. In 1985 the NBA switched the Finals to the 2-3-2 format, which was changed back to the 2-2-1-1-1 format for the 2014 NBA Finals

Game summaries
All times are in Eastern Daylight Time (UTC−4). If the venue is located in a different time zone, the local time is also given.

Game 1

Dallas' Jason Terry scored a playoff-high 32 points as the Mavericks overcame a 31–23 deficit at the end of the first quarter.

Game 2

Dirk Nowitzki had a stellar 30 point and 12 rebound performance, and the Mavericks cruised past the Heat to take a 2–0 series lead.

Game 3

Led by Dwyane Wade's 42 points and 13 rebounds, the Heat rallied from a 13-point deficit with six minutes to go in the fourth quarter. The momentum-changing comeback was capped by a Gary Payton field goal from just inside the three-point line with 9.3 seconds left. Dirk Nowitzki had a chance to tie the game at the free throw line with 3.4 seconds to go, but missed 1 of 2, sealing the win for Miami.

Game 4
Dwyane Wade shined again for the Heat with 36 points, and Miami held Dallas to just seven points in the fourth quarter en route to a series-tying, blowout victory. The Mavericks' fourth quarter was the lowest ever by any team during the NBA Finals. Jerry Stackhouse caught Shaquille O'Neal with a flagrant foul that resulted in his suspension for Game 5. Stackhouse was the final NBA player to be suspended in the NBA Finals until Draymond Green was suspended in the 2016 NBA Finals.

Game 5
Dwyane Wade shot 25 free throws - as many free throws as all the Mavericks combined (a fact that did not sit well with Mavericks head coach Avery Johnson), leading the Heat to their third straight win over Dallas after being down 0–2 in the series.

With 9.1 seconds left in overtime and the Heat trailing by 1 point, they inbounded the ball to Wade, who caught the ball in the air and then landed in the backcourt. Mavericks' team owner Mark Cuban felt Wade had therefore committed a backcourt violation after receiving the ball.

Dallas was then penalized with a controversial foul call that sent Wade to the line to shoot the go-ahead free throws with 1.9 seconds left on the overtime game clock. Wade hit the first free throw, and Dallas Mavericks coach Avery Johnson signaled to his team to call a timeout after Wade's second attempt. Josh Howard then made a timeout gesture with his hands and began to walk off the floor, and the referees called the Mavericks' last remaining timeout, which prevented them from advancing the ball after the second attempt if Wade converted. After the timeout, Wade made the second free throw to give his team a one-point lead, after which Devin Harris missed a Hail Mary half-court shot as time expired. Wade finished the game with 43 points while setting an NBA Finals record for most made free throws in a game with 21. Shaquille O'Neal added a double-double with 18 points and 12 rebounds. Miami converted 32 of its 49 attempts from the free throw line.

Jason Terry led Dallas with 35 points in a losing effort, while Howard added 25. After the game, a frustrated Dirk Nowitzki kicked a ball into the stands and Mavericks owner Mark Cuban caused many "acts of misconduct" resulting in fines of $5,000 and $250,000, respectively, for the two men.

Game 6
Behind Dwyane Wade's 36 points, Miami rallied from a 14-point first half deficit to edge Dallas and win their first championship in franchise history as Jason Terry missed a critical 3-pointer that would've sent the game to overtime. Averaging 34.7 points per game in the championship series, Wade was named NBA Finals MVP (Most Valuable Player).

Player statistics

Miami Heat

|-
| align="left" |  || 4 || 0 || 7.7 || .333 || .000 || .500 || 1.8 || 0.8 || 0.0 || 0.0 || 1.5
|-
| align="left" |  || 1 || 0 || 1.2 || .000 || .000 || .000 || 0.0 || 0.0 || 0.0 || 0.0 || 0.0
|-
| align="left" |  || 6 || 6 || 29.2 || .500 || .000 || .300 || 6.2 || 0.3 || 1.2 || 0.0 || 6.5
|-
| align="left" |  || 1 || 0 || 1.5 || .000 || .000 || .000 || 0.0 || 0.0 || 0.0 || 0.0 || 0.0
|-
| align="left" |  || 6 || 0 || 11.0 || .692 || .000 || .667 || 3.2 || 0.0 || 0.3 || 1.5 || 4.3
|-
| align="left" |  || 6 || 6 || 35.2 || .607 || .000 || .292 || 10.2 || 2.8 || 0.5 || 0.8 || 13.7
|-
| align="left" |  || 6 || 0 || 22.3 || .368 || .143 || .333 || 2.0 || 2.0 || 1.0 || 0.0 || 2.7
|-
| align="left" |  || 6 || 0 || 29.5 || .419 || .400 || .769 || 6.0 || 0.3 || 1.0 || 0.0 || 7.3
|-! style="background:#FDE910;"
| align="left" |  || 6 || 6 || 43.5 || .468 || .273 || .773 || 7.8 || 3.8 || 2.7 || 1.0 || 34.7
|-
| align="left" |  || 6 || 6 || 36.6 || .391 || .270 || .556 || 5.5 || 2.2 || 0.7 || 0.5 || 13.8
|-
| align="left" |  || 6 || 6 || 31.3 || .360 || .345 || .636 || 1.8 || 4.7 || 0.5 || 0.0 || 8.8
|}

Dallas Mavericks

|-
| align="left" |  || 1 || 0 || 6.3 || .000 || .000 || .000 || 1.0 || 0.0 || 0.0 || 0.0 || 0.0
|-
| align="left" |  || 6 || 0 || 24.6 || .722 || .000 || .500 || 8.2 || 0.3 || 1.0 || 0.7 || 5.7
|-
| align="left" |  || 6 || 0 || 8.8 || .545 || .333 || .800 || 0.5 || 1.3 || 0.0 || 0.0 || 2.8
|-
| align="left" |  || 6 || 6 || 15.7 || .500 || .000 || .500 || 3.3 || 0.2 || 0.3 || 0.8 || 1.7
|-
| align="left" |  || 6 || 3 || 13.7 || .563 || .000 || .000 || 3.2 || 0.8 || 0.8 || 0.0 || 3.0
|-
| align="left" |  || 6 || 3 || 24.5 || .364 || .000 || .750 || 0.8 || 2.8 || 0.8 || 0.0 || 7.3
|-
| align="left" |  || 6 || 6 || 38.4 || .388 || .263 || .808 || 8.2 || 1.8 || 1.2 || 0.7 || 14.7
|-
| align="left" |  || 2 || 0 || 4.5 || .000 || .000 || .000 || 1.5 || 0.0 || 0.0 || 0.0 || 0.0
|-
| align="left" |  || 6 || 6 || 43.7 || .390 || .250 || .891 || 10.8 || 2.5 || 0.7 || 0.7 || 22.8
|-
| align="left" |  || 1 || 0 || 3.6 || .000 || .000 || .000 || 1.0 || 0.0 || 0.0 || 0.0 || 0.0
|-
| align="left" |  || 5 || 0 || 30.0 || .355 || .368 || .929 || 3.4 || 3.0 || 0.8 || 0.6 || 12.8
|-
| align="left" |  || 6 || 6 || 40.0 || .478 || .317 || .733 || 2.2 || 3.5 || 1.8 || 0.0 || 22.0
|-
| align="left" |  || 5 || 0 || 7.8 || .273 || .167 || .0000 || 1.2 || 0.0 || 0.0 || 0.0 || 1.4
|}

Aftermath
The Mavericks would post the league's best record with 67 victories in the 2006–07 NBA season but were ousted by the eight-seeded Golden State Warriors in a six-game first round of the 2007 NBA Playoffs. The Mavs' playoff defeat marked the first time a top seed was eliminated in a seven-game first round series since it was implemented in 2003. Still, Dirk Nowitzki was named the regular season MVP at season's end. After another playoff loss to the New Orleans Hornets in 2008, in which the Mavericks brought back Jason Kidd, head coach Avery Johnson was fired and replaced by Rick Carlisle. After another two early playoff exits, the Mavericks won 57 games in the 2010–11 season and returned to the Finals.

The Heat would lose convincingly by 42 points to the Chicago Bulls in the opening night of the 2006–07 season, the worst opening-day margin of defeat for a defending champion in NBA history. Injuries would keep the team from surpassing or even equaling last season's total, yet they still won the Southeast Division despite winning only 44 games. The Bulls would oust them in a four-game sweep in the first round of the playoffs, the first such occurrence since 1957. The following year, Miami completed its two-year turnaround from NBA champion to the NBA's worst team by winning only 15 games, equaling the mark set by the team in their inaugural season, which saw Shaquille O'Neal traded to the Phoenix Suns in mid-season and Dwyane Wade missing 31 games. The Heat gradually climbed back to contention in the Erik Spoelstra era, culminating in the much-publicized free-agent acquisitions of LeBron James and Chris Bosh. The Heat won 58 games in the 2010–11 season, and along with the Mavericks, returned to the Finals in 2011.

The 2011 NBA Finals, which was a rematch of 2006, saw the Mavericks win in six games after trailing 2–1 in the Finals. It was the Mavericks' first NBA championship, as well as both teams' second appearances in the Finals. Dirk Nowitzki was named Finals MVP.

, this was Miami's fifth championship out of a total of seven among the Big Four sports leagues; the MLB's National League Florida (now Miami) Marlins won the World Series in 1997 and 2003 while the NFL's Miami Dolphins won the Super Bowl in 1972 and 1973. The Miami Heat would go on to win a second championship in 2012 against the Thunder in 5 games and a third championship in 2013 against the San Antonio Spurs in 7 games before falling in 2014 against the same Spurs team in 5 games.

This was the second "Big Four" postseason game or series to pit a team from Miami against a team from Dallas. In 1971, the Dallas Cowboys defeated the Dolphins to claim their first of five Super Bowls. As of 2020, the city's NHL teams, the Stars and Panthers, have not met in the playoffs, as are their MLB counterparts the Rangers and Marlins.

References

External links

National Basketball Association Finals
Finals
NBA
NBA
N
N
2000s in Dallas
2006 in Texas
N
Sports competitions in Miami
Sports competitions in Dallas
National Basketball Association controversies